The Leicester Urban Area or Leicester Built Up Area (2011 onwards) is an urban agglomeration defined by the Office of National Statistics (ONS), centred on the City of Leicester in the English Midlands. With a population of 508,916 at the time of the 2011 census, the Built Up Area is the eleventh largest in England and thirteenth largest in the United Kingdom. It comprises Leicester itself and its suburbs, all of which are contiguous with, or situated in close proximity to, the city. 

As at 2011 the Leicester Urban Area was home to 51.8% of the total population of Leicestershire (2001: 48.5%). A 2017 quote from the Leicester City Council website states that "The Greater Leicester urban area is one of the fastest growing in the country, with a population of about 650,000, of which 350,000 live within the city council area".

Analysis: 2011

Analysis: 2001

Analysis: 1991

Analysis: 1981

Analysis: Notes
The Leicester ONS sub-totals are explained with reference to the following:
For 2011, there have been certain reclassifications from 'outer' to 'inner suburbs' thus contributing to the increase in population of Leicester ONS compared to 2001 and prior.
The ONS's definition of "Leicester" in the 2001 census excluded the northern area of the Beaumont Leys ward, which was counted separately, and amalgamated several surrounding towns and villages. Its boundaries and population were not the same as that of the Leicester UNITARY, which had a separate population of 279,921 at the 2001 Census and includes Beaumont Leys. See the 2001 Leicester ONS analysis.
Ongoing refinements in methodology between the two census dates meant that contiguous suburbs, external to the city boundaries and which were subdivided up to 2001, were merged into the 2011 Leicester ONS figure. These, along with infilling at the margins, also accounted for the removal of Ratby and the addition of new subdivisions.
 Leicester ONS figures do not include the Ashton Green/Glebelands/Thurcaston Park development (containing 556 residents in 2011). Although within the city boundaries, this incipient addition is in effect a satellite village given that there is 'green separation'. This categorisation is likely to change as future residential expansion planned around the development, converges towards Beaumont Leys and Birstall; both part of the urban area/BUA.
The Kirby Muxloe figures up to 2001 includes the portion of Leicester Forest East which is to the west of the M1 motorway. The eastern section is part of the Leicester ONS subdivision, and is listed separately in the 2001 table.

Although Stoughton is shown as a small leg of the urban area, its figures are not counted.

See also
 List of settlements in Leicestershire by population
 List of urban areas in the United Kingdom
 List of metropolitan areas in the United Kingdom
 City Regions (United Kingdom; North, West and North Sussex-super-Mare)

References

External links 
 Scalable Office for National Statistics map of the 2011 Leicester Urban Area
Office for National Statistics: Census 2001 - Table KS01 (Usual resident population)
Office for National Statistics: Census 2001 - Maps and index to urban areas

Leicester
Geography of Leicestershire
Urban areas of England